Dagfin is a 1926 German silent film directed by Joe May and starring Paul Richter, Alfred Gerasch and Marcella Albani.

The film's art direction was by Ernst Schütte and Erich Zander.

Cast
 Paul Richter as Dagfin Holberg, ein Skiführer  
 Alfred Gerasch as Axel Boysen  
 Marcella Albani as Lydia, seine Frau  
 Hedwig Wangel as Ihre Zofe  
 Alexander Murski as Oberst von Gain  
 Mary Johnson as Tilly, seine Tochter  
 Paul Wegener as Sabi Bey, türkischer General  
 Nien Soen Ling as Garron, sein Sekretär  
 Ernst Deutsch as Assairan, ein Armenier  
 Paul Biensfeldt

References

Bibliography
 Thomas Elsaesser & Michael Wedel. The BFI companion to German cinema. British Film Institute, 1999.

External links

1926 films
Films of the Weimar Republic
Films directed by Joe May
German silent feature films
Films produced by Joe May
Films with screenplays by Joe May
German black-and-white films
Phoebus Film films